Furcinetechma sangaycola is a species of moth of the family Tortricidae. It is found in Ecuador (Morona-Santiago Province).

The ground colour of the forewings is cream, tinged with brownish and suffused with brown along the costa and the termen. The dots are blackish brown and the markings are brownish black. The hindwings are brownish cream, but cream basally. The strigulation is greyish cream.

Etymology
The species name refers to the name of the Sangay National Park, where the species was first collected.

References

External links

Moths described in 2009
Endemic fauna of Ecuador
Euliini
Moths of South America
Taxa named by Józef Razowski